Chuang Chia-jung and Sania Mirza were the defenders of the championship title, but Mirza chose not to compete.
Chuang partnered up with Peng Shuai, but Bethanie Mattek-Sands and Yan Zi but defeated them 4–6, 6–4, [10–8].

Seeds

Draw

Draw

References
Main Draw

MPS Group Championships - Doubles
Doubles